The OA-93 is an AR-15 derivative pistol manufactured by Olympic Arms. Lacking a buttstock or buffer tube, the OA-93 disperses recoil through a specially designed flat top upper receiver similar to the Armalite AR-18. However, the passage of the 1994 Crime Bill required Olympic Arms to perform modifications to the basic design to continue selling them: 

The first revision to the OA-93 was the OA-96 in which a 30-round ammunition well is pinned and welded in place so that it cannot be detached. In addition, the OA-96 has a button in the rear which opens the upper receiver and can then be loaded via stripper clips.

The second revision followed two years later. OA-98 used a detachable magazine but the body was skeletonized to reduce the weight below the 50 ounce restriction to allow the OA-98 to have one more feature to be compliant with the 1994 Crime Bill.

A piston driven carbine based on the pistol was made in 1993 and after the expiration of the Federal Assault Weapons Ban from 2004 to 2007.

References

External links

Manual

5.56 mm firearms
ArmaLite AR-10 derivatives
Weapons and ammunition introduced in 1993